Miguel Valdes (born 29 June 1940) is a Cuban former sports shooter. He competed at the 1972, 1976 and the 1980 Summer Olympics.

References

1940 births
Living people
Cuban male sport shooters
Olympic shooters of Cuba
Shooters at the 1972 Summer Olympics
Shooters at the 1976 Summer Olympics
Shooters at the 1980 Summer Olympics
Place of birth missing (living people)
Pan American Games medalists in shooting
Pan American Games silver medalists for Cuba
Pan American Games bronze medalists for Cuba
Shooters at the 1971 Pan American Games
Shooters at the 1975 Pan American Games
Shooters at the 1979 Pan American Games
Shooters at the 1983 Pan American Games
20th-century Cuban people